Serixia albopleura is a species of beetle in the family Cerambycidae. It was described by Gressitt in 1935.

References

Serixia
Beetles described in 1935